Alejandro Gertz Manero (31 October 1939) is a Mexican lawyer and  Attorney General of Mexico. He served as Secretary of Public Security during part of Vicente Fox's government. From 2009 to 2012 he served as Deputy of the LXI Legislature of the Mexican Congress representing the State of Mexico.

Controversies 

 In 2022 he was accused of abusing his position as Federal Prosecutor for a personal vendetta, illegally persecuting and jailing Alejandra Cuevas and Laura Moran for the death of his brother Federico Gertz in 2015.

 He was accused of influence trafficking and criminal association by the former Counsel to the President, Julio Scherer Ibarra.
 He owns several real estate properties in Madrid, Ibiza, Paris, Nueva York, and Los Angeles, and bought 122 luxury vehicles.
 In 2021 he was admitted to the Mexican National Researchers System by a special committee, after having tried unsuccessfully for 11 years due to insufficient scientific output. Writer Guillermo Sheridan showed evidence of plagiarism in a biography of Guillermo Prieto published by Gertz Manero, which was also reported by a group of 77 researchers.
 When he was Public Safety Secretary in the government of Vicente Fox, Gertz Manero was detained by DEA and ATF when he landed in New York in an official Mexican government plane, carrying a false passport and $50,000 dlls in cash. In 2022 the USA government opened another investigation on him.

References

1939 births
Living people
Politicians from Mexico City
20th-century Mexican lawyers
Members of the Chamber of Deputies (Mexico) for the State of Mexico
Citizens' Movement (Mexico) politicians
Mexican Secretaries of Public Safety
21st-century Mexican politicians
Attorneys general of Mexico
People named in the Paradise Papers
Deputies of the LXI Legislature of Mexico
21st-century Mexican lawyers